Fatima Babiker Mahmoud is a Sudanese-born socialist feminist.

Biography 
She graduated from the University of Khartoum and earned her doctorate at the University of Hull. Her doctoral thesis was the basis of her most-frequently cited work, The Sudanese Bourgeoisie:Vanguard of Development? in which she traced the historical development of the modern Sudanese bourgeoisie and concluded that it had no progressive role to play in the development of Sudan.

The Pan-African Women's Liberation Organisation (PAWLO) was established at the time of the 7th Pan-African Conference in Kampala, Uganda in April 1994, and Mahmoud became its founding President.  Addressing the first meeting of PAWLO, she said:

"African women share a common history, a common conceptual framework in understanding our reality in order to change it, and common enemies and friends within and outside Africa. We have similar challenges to face and a better future to look forward to. There is now a serious need for a new Pan African Women's organisation, embracing African women on the continent and in the diaspora, to address these commonalities."

Mahmoud has previously served as a member of the Editorial Advisory Board for the Journal of Gender Studies.

Selected writing
المرأة الافريقية بين الارث والحداثة (African Women Between Heritage and Modernity) (2002)
African Women, Transformation and Development (1991)
Calamity in the Sudan: Civilian Versus Military Rule (1988)
The Sudanese Bourgeoisie: Vanguard of Development? (1984)

References

Year of birth missing (living people)
Living people
Sudanese expatriates in the United Kingdom
Sudanese feminists
Sudanese socialists
Pan-Africanism